High Lonesome is a 1950 American Technicolor Western film written and directed by Alan Le May, who remains famous for writing the classic Western novels The Searchers and The Unforgiven as well as numerous screenplays. High Lonesome was Le May's only directorial credit. The picture stars John Drew Barrymore (billed as "John Barrymore, Jr."), features Chill Wills and Jack Elam and is set in the Big Bend country of West Texas.

Plot
A young drifter is found stealing food at Horse Davis' ranch by Boatwhistle, the cook. Another rancher, Pat Farrell, who is engaged to Horse's daughter Abby, believes the boy to also be a horse thief and possibly worse.

Given the nickname Cooncat by the cook, the boy explains that he was wrongfully accused of murdering a man named Shell and has fled from the law. Shell owed him money, he says, and two strangers known as Smiling Man and Roper gave him a gun to confront Shell. He wound up unconscious and next to Shell's bullet-riddled body.

Horse doubts the boy's story, though youngest daughter Meagan believes it. At a barn-warming party for Pat, word comes that his parents have been found murdered. A livid Pat is ready to hang Cooncat for the crime. Horse talks him out of it, creating a rift between the two old friends.

Smiling Man and Roper turn up in the bunkhouse. They laugh at Cooncat's predicament and call him their lucky charm. Boatwhistle is killed by Smiling Man, and Cooncat flees the ranch before the rest of the family gets home. Horse decides Pat was right about the boy and plans to ride out to hunt him down in the morning. Cooncat comes back and talks to Meagan through her window before returning to the trading post to look for the body of Jim Shell. Megan leaves a note for her father and goes with him. The Roper and Smiling Man show up, and Megan and Cooncat hide in some ruins until morning, when Horse Davis, Frank, Dixie, and Pat Farrell show up. Horse starts to go into the trading post to ambush who he thinks is Cooncat, but is really the Roper and Smiling Man. Cooncat comes out of hiding to warn him and is shot by the two inside. Horse goes in and confronts them, killing the Roper, but is knocked down by the Smiling Man. Pat shoots Smiling Man just as he is about to kill Horse, and as Meagan cradles the wounded Cooncat, Pat and Horse agree to take him under their wing.

Cast
 John Barrymore Jr. as Cooncat
 Chill Wills as Boatwhistle
 John Archer as Pat Farrell
 Lois Butler as Meagan Davis
 Kristine Miller as Abby Davis
 Basil Ruysdael as "Horse" Davis
 Jack Elam as Smiling Man
 Dave Kashner as Roper
 Frank Cordell as Frank
 Clem Fuller as Dixie
 Hugh Aiken as Art Simms
 Howard Joslin as Jim Shell

Production
John Drew Barrymore was the son of John Barrymore and the father of Drew Barrymore.

The movie was filmed on location in Antelope Springs and Marfa, Presidio County, Texas.

References

External links
 
 
 

1950 films
Eagle-Lion Films films
1950 Western (genre) films
American Western (genre) films
Films shot in Texas
1950s English-language films
1950s American films